"Be Good Johnny" is a song recorded by the Australian band Men at Work, released in April 1982 as the third and final single from their debut album, Business as Usual.

Content
The song is written from the viewpoint of a 9-year-old boy who is constantly being told to be good, but prefers to daydream rather than concentrate in class or play sports.  Johnny feels like he understands some of his instructions, but also that he is completely misunderstood by the adult world. The lead singer, Colin Hay, uses his voice in different ways throughout the song to imitate Johnny, Johnny's mother and father, and his teacher.  The song also features spoken dialogue by keyboardist Greg Ham as he tries to figure out what Johnny is like. The title of the song is a reference to the Chuck Berry song "Johnny B. Goode".

Cover versions
Colin Hay covered a solo version on his album Man @ Work, and this version is used as the theme song of the American version of the reality TV program Supernanny.

Personnel 

 Colin Hay – guitar, lead vocals
 Greg Ham – keyboards, background vocals
 Ron Strykert – guitar, background vocals
 John Rees – bass, background vocals
 Jerry Speiser – drums, background vocals

Charts

Weekly charts

Year-end charts

References

1982 singles
Men at Work songs
Songs written by Colin Hay
1981 songs
Columbia Records singles
Australian synth-pop songs
Dance-rock songs